Kirsty Child is an Australian character actress, known for her roles in the television series Prisoner and Neighbours.

Biography

Child had several character parts in the Crawford Productions TV staples.

Her film roles include Country Town in 1971 and in the classic 1975 Australian film adaptation of the Joan Lindsay novel Picnic at Hanging Rock.

Child had three roles in drama series Prisoner. The first two were guest roles, Anne Yates in 1979, a prison officer turned drug dealer and Glynis Johnson in 1983, the sister of an inmate. In 1985, she returned in a more prominent role as supercilious fence Willie Beecham who returned at the end of the series' run in 1986.

In 1989, she had a leading role in the drama series Inside Running. Other television guest roles included Cop Shop and Blue Heelers.

In 2002, featured in the Australian soap opera Neighbours as Carmel Tyler, the older sister of Susan Kennedy (Jackie Woodburne). She reprised her role as Carmel on Neighbours in November 2012 for two months.

Child is the widow of New Zealand-born Australian actor Peter Adams, who died in December 1999.

Filmography (selected)

References

External links
 

Australian film actresses
Australian soap opera actresses
Living people
20th-century Australian actresses
21st-century Australian actresses
Year of birth missing (living people)